Marcus Larae Knight (born June 19, 1978) is an American football coach and former wide receiver who is currently the wide receivers coach at Ball State University. He played college football at Michigan and professionally as a wide receiver and kick returner for the Oakland Raiders of the NFL and wide receiver and defensive back for the Philadelphia Soul and Columbus Destroyers of the Arena Football League.

Marcus Knight retired from playing in 2008 and was hired by Valparaiso University as the wide receivers coach.

Knight's nephew, Zelous Wheeler, is a professional baseball player.

References

External links

NFL.com profile
Indiana State biography
Tampa Bay Buccaneers biography

1978 births
American football defensive backs
American football wide receivers
Amsterdam Admirals players
Columbus Destroyers players
Living people
Michigan Wolverines football players
Oakland Raiders players
People from Sylacauga, Alabama
Players of American football from Alabama
Philadelphia Soul players
Tampa Bay Buccaneers players
Valparaiso Beacons football coaches
Northern Michigan Wildcats football coaches
Central Michigan Chippewas football coaches
Indiana State Sycamores football coaches
American football return specialists